The PRSL PlayOffs Cup is the annual championship tournament of the Puerto Rico Soccer League. The winner gets an automatic bid to CFU Club Championship.

History

Puerto Rico Soccer League Playoff Champions by Season

2008 Puerto Rico Soccer League Playoffs 
The 2008 Puerto Rico Soccer League PlayOffs is the first year that the tournament has been held. It is the championship cup for the Puerto Rico Soccer League. The format is set up for the top 4 teams from the Regular Season cup playing in the Tournament. These teams play a semi-final match, with the winner of each advancing on to the championship game.

Champions
Sevilla FC Bayamón won the Championship as they defeated CA River Plate Ponce 2-1 in the Final.

2009 Puerto Rico Soccer League Playoffs
The 2009 Puerto Rico Soccer League PlayOffs is the second year that this format has been used. The format follows the same as the 2008 edition, with the top 4 teams from the Regular Season cup playing in the Tournament, but with the addition of a Home Leg and an Away Leg for the semifinal and final matches.

Champions
Bayamón FC won the championship as they defeated Atlético de San Juan FC 3-2 in aggregate.

2010 Puerto Rico Soccer League Playoffs
There was no PlayOffs cup this year, since the regular season was suspended. In its place, the Súper Copa DirectTV was held to determine Puerto Rico's representatives at the 2011 CFU Club Championship.

2011 Puerto Rico Soccer League Playoffs
The 2009 Puerto Rico Soccer League PlayOffs presented two changes from previous seasons. First, it went back to a single leg format. Second, it did not have all four semifinalist play each other. In its place, the quarterfinal saw the third and fourth placed teams in the Regular Season cup facing each other. The winner went off to face the second placed team in the semifinals. Finally, the winner of the semifinal went off to face the champion of the Regular Season cup for the PlayOff Championship.

+ Mayagüez FC (fifth placed) replaced the fourth placed Puerto Rico United SC as it had been suspended by PRSL.

Champions
FC Leones de Ponce won the championship as they defeated Sevilla FC Juncos in penalties. After 120 minutes, the match ended up with a 1-goal each tie. In the penalty round, the first three attempts for FC Leones de Ponce were successful, and the team managed to stop all three first attempts for Sevilla FC PR, earning its first championship title.

See also

 Puerto Rican Football Federation
 Puerto Rico national football team
 Puerto Rico U-20 national football team
 Liga Nacional de Futbol de Puerto Rico
 Association Football in Puerto Rico
 Puerto Rico Islanders

References

External links
Federación Puertorriqueña de Fútbol
 Futbol de Puerto Rico

Playoff Cup
Defunct football competitions in Puerto Rico